The Université Constantine 1, formerly the University of Mentouri, is a university located in Constantine, Algeria. Designed by Brazilian architect Oscar Niemeyer, the university was built from 1969 to 1972.

See also 
 List of universities in Algeria

References

External links
 http://www.umc.edu.dz/

Mentouri
Buildings and structures in Constantine, Algeria
Oscar Niemeyer buildings
Educational institutions established in 1969
1969 establishments in Algeria